Chao Chih-Kuo (born 9 December 1972) is a retired Taiwanese long jumper.

He won the silver medals at both the 1993 and 1995 Asian Championships, and finished eleventh at the 1995 Summer Universiade. He also competed at the 1995 World Indoor Championships, the 1995 World Championships, the 1996 Olympic Games and the 1998 Asian Games without reaching the final.

His personal best jump was 8.16 metres, achieved on 6 May 1995 at the 39th Penghu County Athletics Championships.

References

1972 births
Living people
Taiwanese male long jumpers
Athletes (track and field) at the 1996 Summer Olympics
Olympic athletes of Taiwan
Athletes (track and field) at the 1994 Asian Games
Athletes (track and field) at the 1998 Asian Games
Asian Games competitors for Chinese Taipei